The Supreme Genius of King Khan and the Shrines is the seventh studio album by the nine-member psychedelic soul band King Khan and the Shrines. It was released on June 17, 2008, by Vice Records.

Track listing

References 

2008 albums
King Khan and the Shrines albums